This article lists the highest-attended concerts of all time. The oldest 100,000-crowd concert reported to Billboard Boxscore is Grateful Dead's gig at the Raceway Park, Englishtown, New Jersey on September 3, 1977. The concert was attended by 107,019 people, which remains the largest ticketed concert in the United States to date. Frank Sinatra, Tina Turner, and Paul McCartney broke the record respectively in Maracanã Stadium. With an audience of over 184,000 people on April 21, 1990, McCartney's record was broken by a Japanese rock band, Glay, which held a concert with an audience of 200,000 people on July 31, 1999, in Chiba, Japan (Makuhari Parking Lot). GLAY held the record for 6 years. Italian singer Vasco Rossi surpassed the record with his solo concert on July 1, 2017. The concert was a celebration of his 40 years of career. 

Although the attendance numbers of free concerts are known to be exaggerations, several concerts have been reported to have a million audience or more. Both Jean-Michel Jarre's concert in Moscow 1997 and Rod Stewart's concert in Copacabana 1994 have been reported to attract audiences of more than 3.5 million people. Jean-Michel Jarre has attracted a live audience of more than a million spectators on five occasions, three times in Paris, 1979, 1990 and 1995, once in Houston, 1986, and once in Moscow, 1997. He is the only artist ever to have done so. Metallica played Moscow in 1991 in front of 1.6 million people.

Highest-attended concerts

Single-artist concerts
The following are the highest-attended single artist's ticketed concerts (excluding music festivals) with attendance of 100,000 people or more.

Free concerts
The following are free concerts with reported attendance of one million people or more. The first ever was by French artist Jean-Michel Jarre in Paris in 1979, which created the Guinness Book entry. It also includes multi-artist festivals which may not be directly comparable with single-artist concerts. Attendance numbers for many of the kinds of events listed here rely on estimations from the promoters and are known to be exaggerations.

See also
List of highest-grossing concert tours
List of largest peaceful gatherings

References

Lists of concerts and performances
Entertainment-related lists of superlatives